The Cleveland Women's Orchestra is an American orchestra made up entirely of female musicians, based in Cleveland, Ohio.  It was founded in 1935 and performed its first concert in 1936.  It is one of the oldest women's orchestra in the world after the Orchestre féminin de Paris (founded in 1930).

The orchestra's music director from its founding was Hyman Schandler. Schandler, also a violinist in the Cleveland Orchestra, continued as conductor into the 1980s. The current music director is Robert L. Cronquist.

See also
Cleveland Orchestra
Cleveland Philharmonic Orchestra
Cleveland Chamber Symphony
CityMusic Cleveland
Red (an orchestra)

External links
Cleveland Women's Orchestra official site

Musical groups established in 1935
All-female bands
Musical groups from Cleveland
Women's orchestras
Women in Ohio
1935 establishments in Ohio
Orchestras based in Ohio